The 2004 Buffalo Bulls football team represented the University at Buffalo in the 2004 NCAA Division I-A football season. The Bulls offense scored 197 points while the defense allowed 351 points.

Schedule

References

Buffalo
Buffalo Bulls football seasons
Buffalo Bulls football